The National Hemophilia Foundation (NHF) is a United States patient advocacy organization for the care and treatment of inheritable blood and bleeding disorders such as hemophilia and von Willebrand disease. Founded in 1948, the NHF helps secure funding for treatment centers, and develops national guidelines for treatment and health care policy. The organization also serves as a central point for information on the disorders.

History

The National Hemophilia Foundation was founded in 1948, as the first national hemophilia advocacy organization in the United States. One of its early initiatives was to secure funding for Comprehensive Hemophilia Diagnostic and Treatment Centers (HTC).

In 1993, the foundation received media coverage of its efforts to hold health care company Baxter International accountable for infecting 10,000 hemophiliac members with AIDS due to HIV contaminated clotting products.

In 1994, the NHF lobbied the FDA's blood products advisory committee (BPAC) to add Parvovirus B19 and Hepatitis A risk warnings to plasma products.

In 1998, the NHF convened the first Women with Bleeding Disorders Task Force, to address the difficulties women had in getting proper treatment.

In 2008, former NHF Board Chair and health advocate Val Bias became the group's CEO.

In 2013, actress and comedian Alex Borstein became the NHF's spokesperson for genetic testing. In October, Borstein hosted the NHF's inaugural "What's So Bloody Funny" comedy fundraiser.

In 2016, the NHF began recognizing March as Bleeding Disorders Awareness Month, to raise hemophilia and von Willebrand disease awareness among stakeholders. Also in 2016, as part of the foundation's awareness efforts, it started the Red Tie Campaign, with the symbol representing blood and the community coming together to help those with blood disorders. 

In 2018, the NHF launched an advocacy campaign on Capitol Hill in Washington DC, where 500 members of the bleeding disorders community met with 300 members of Congress and their staffs.

In 2019, CEO Bias retired, and was replaced as CEO and president by Leonard Valentino.

In July 2022, the organization petitioned the FDA to require a risk evaluation and mitigation strategy (REMS) to ensure the safety of valoctocogene roxaparvovec and etranacogene dezaparvovec, two gene therapy treatments the FDA was considering for approval for hemophilia treatment.

Activities 

The NHF raises money and awareness of blood diseases, and supports research to end the diseases.  Its efforts include lobbying Congress to help people with bleeding disorders.

The NHF honors Bleeding Disorders Awareness Month, to raise awareness of bleeding disorders among the public, lawmakers, medical professionals and others. Related annual fundraising campaigns are called Red Tie Campaigns. The NRF also hosts comedy fundraisers to support its efforts.

The organization also organizes an annual national Unite Day event to encourage community participation in the foundation's mission. The day includes a Unite for Bleeding Disorders Walk.

The NHF also awards the Jason Fulton Memorial Scholarship, to members of its two year National Youth Leadership Institute (NYLI) professional development program who help the hemophiliac community.

References

External links
 

Haemophilia
Organizations established in 1948